Frederick Douglas Hodges  (19 April 1918 - 21 July 1999) was a Canadian labour leader, civil rights activist, politician and humanitarian.

Early life 
Hodges was born in Saint John, New Brunswick, Canada to Lloyd Hodges and Drusilla Oliver - descendants of Black Loyalists who arrived in New Brunswick in the 1780s following the American Revolution. In the 1940s, Hodges worked as a freight handler with the Canadian Pacific Railway. During the Second World War, he served for two years in the Royal Canadian Airforce as a radio-telephone operator in Yarmouth, Nova Scotia, Canada.

Career 
Hodges maintained an active and long-running career in politics.

In 1946, Hodges returned to work as a freight handler for the CPR, who had a collective agreement with the Winterport Lodge 797 of the Brotherhood of Railway, Airline and Steamship Clerks, Freight Handlers, Express and Station Employees.  Hodges became the first Black member of Lodge 747 when the union amended their constitution to permit memberships for Black workers in 1947. He maintained his membership for over 50 years. In the 1950s, Hodges lobbied for the Saint John District Labour Council to establish a standing committee on human rights, becoming its first chairman. In 1964, he became the first Black president of the Saint John District Labour Council, and served for 11 years.

In 1962, Hodges became a trustee within the New Brunswick Federation of Labour. In 1969, Hodges was elected the vice-president of the New Brunswick Federation of Labour for the counties of Saint John-Charlotte-Queens, serving for 6 years. Hodges was a founding member of the New Brunswick Association for the Advancement of Coloured People. He was also appointed to the New Brunswick Human Rights Commission.

In 1974, Hodges ran as an official labour candidate and was became the first member of a visible minority to be elected as city councillor of Saint John.

Hodges' other memberships and roles included:

 a vice-chairman of the Saint John Port Industrial Commission
 Commissioner of the New Brunswick Human Rights Commission
 labour's representative on the New Brunswick Labour Relations Board
 vice-chairman of the Saint John Association to Abolish the Death Penalty
 vice-chairman of the Saint John Citizenship Association
 a director of the John Howard Society
 chairman of the Human Rights Awareness Association of Saint John
 chairman of the Civil Liberties Association—Saint John
 a director of the Civil Liberties Association of Canada
 a member of the Multicultural Association of Fredericton and Saint John
 a director of the College Development Committee UNBSJ
 an advisory board member to the New Brunswick Community College
 a member of the Planning Advisory Committee that created Market Square
 chairman and founding member of the first Saint John grocery Co-op
 co-chairman of the “Saint John Unity Committee,” which was created in the 1970s in an effort to promote the city.

Following Hodges' retirement in 1984, he maintained that labour movements or visible minorities were still not sufficiently accepted in Saint John, citing a lack of representation. Addressing the issue, Hodges stated that “the only way it will ever change is for these groups to keep united as a collective group and to make their voice known through the ballot box.”

Awards 
In 1978, Hodges received the Queen's Jubilee Medal.

On October 29, 1979, the New Brunswick Association for the Advancement of Coloured People hosted a testimonial dinner for Hodges in which over 350 people attended to honor him for his contributions to Saint John. While there, Hodges received a certificate of merit from the city of Saint John and a commendation from Premier Richard Hatfield.

In 1982, he received Canada's highest distinction, the Order of Canada for his work within labour, educational and municipal bodies, as well as his efforts "to further equal opportunities for minority groups."

In 1984, he was awarded a Honorary Doctor of Laws from the University of New Brunswick.

Hodges received the New Brunswick Human Rights Award from the New Brunswick Human Rights Commission for his "outstanding contributions to advance human rights."

Personal life 
Hodges married Olive Mildred Stewart in 1940 and had six children together. Olive died in 1965. In 1983, Hodges married Eugenia Simmons.

Upon being asked about his philosophy, Hodges stated: “accomplish what you can accomplish, then get a good night’s sleep.”

Hodges died on July 21, 1999, en route to the hospital after suffering a heart attack while vacationing in Nova Scotia.

References 

1918 births
1999 deaths
Saint John, New Brunswick city councillors
20th-century Canadian politicians
Members of the Order of Canada
Black Canadian activists
Black Canadian politicians